Wisma FAM is a training facility and the main headquarters for the Football Association of Malaysia located at Kelana Jaya, Selangor, Malaysia. The Facility is founded by the Football Association of Malaysia with it purpose to serve as the Football Association of Malaysia main headquarters and also serves as a training ground for the National Football teams of Malaysia.

History
Wisma FAM was established during the late 1990s as the Football Association of Malaysia required a main headquarters and also a descent Training ground for the National Football teams of Malaysia. In that time, the Football Association of Malaysia headquarters were at the City Halls in various states and the National team trained at different Training ground in the whole Malaysia.

When the Football Association of Malaysia agreed to established Wisma FAM, The facility was immediately declared as the main headquarters for the Football Association of Malaysia and the National team. Wisma FAM is used for all the national football team including the Senior Team, The Women's Team, The Olympic Team and the national futsal team.

The facility has also serves as a meeting point, A room for press statement and the facility also contain small apartment rooms for the national players. Ticket matches can also be sold here at Wisma FAM.

It can also host a friendly match that involves any of the Malaysia national teams.

Matches
The Malaysia's national teams friendly matches that Wisma FAM hosted:

Facilities
Wisma FAM is equipped with the following facilities:

 Office Block, contains various rooms such as a ticket booth and announcement room.
 Condo Block, contains around 30 rooms for players and staff.
 A fully equipped Sport's Gym
 A full-length Swimming pool
 1x 1000 flux floodlights
 1x 650 flux floodlights 
 1x 500 flux floodlights
 42m long x 25m wide Futsal pitch, with 500 flux floodlights
 45m x 90m Artificial turfed football pitch, with a 650 flux floodlights
 A large empty field, used for various events and sports, equipped with a 1000 flux floodlights.

See also
 Football Association of Malaysia

References

External links
Wisma FAM at Wikimapia

Sports venues in Selangor